CBND may refer to:

Cannabinodiol, a cannabinoid
Compagnie Béninoise de Négoce et de Distribution, a retail and trading company in Benin